Prince Adam Stanisław Sapieha (4 December 1828– 21 July 1903) was a Polish nobleman, landlord, politician.

His mother, Jadwiga Sapieżyna, was a daughter of the 12th Ordynat of the Ordynacja Zamojska Count Stanisław Kostka Zamoyski.

In 1894, he became Head of the Exhibition Committee of the General National Exhibition in Lviv.

Children
 Władysław Leon Sapieha (1853-1920) - husband of Countess Elżbieta Konstancja Potulicka, great-grandfather of Queen Mathilde of Belgium
 Maria Jadwiga Sapieha (1855-1929) - wife of Count Stanisław Żółtowski
 Leon Paweł Sapieha (1856-1893) - husband of Princess Teresa Elżbieta z Sanguszków-Kowelska
 Helena Maria Sapieha (1857-1947) - wife of Count Edward Adam Stadnicki
 Paweł Jan Sapieha (1860-1934) - first president of the Polish Red Cross, married to Matylda Paula Eleonora z Windisch-Graetzów
 Jan Piotr Sapieha (1865-1954) - husband of  Alicja Probyn
 Adam Stefan Sapieha (1867-1951) - Cardinal-Archbishop Krakow, Poland

Bibliography
 Obywatele Honorowi Królewskiego Wolnego Miasta Sanoka, Sanok 2002, s. 55-56.

References 
 Ancestry

1828 births
1903 deaths
Nobility from Warsaw
People from Congress Poland
Adam Stanislaw
Members of the Austrian House of Deputies (1871–1873)
Members of the Diet of Galicia and Lodomeria
Polish diplomats of the January Uprising
20th-century Polish landowners
19th-century Polish landowners
Knights of the Golden Fleece